Plush TV Jazz-Rock Party is a live video recording of a PBS In the Spotlight special on Steely Dan, released in 2000. This video focuses on a special concert, recorded live in January 2000 at the Sony Studios in New York City, New York, and features tracks from their (at the time) unreleased album Two Against Nature but also contains additional documentary footage.

Track listing
All songs composed by Walter Becker and Donald Fagen.

"Green Earrings"
"Cousin Dupree"
"Bad Sneakers"
"Janie Runaway"
"Josie"
"FM"
"Gaslighting Abbie"
"Black Friday"
"Babylon Sisters"
"Kid Charlemagne"
"Jack of Speed"
"Peg"
"What a Shame About Me"
"Pretzel Logic"; End Credits

Personnel
Walter Becker -  guitar
Donald Fagen - Fender Rhodes, Lead Vocals
Ted Baker - piano
Jon Herington - guitar
Tom Barney - bass
Cornelius Bumpus and Chris Potter - saxophone
Michael Leonhart - trumpet
Jim Pugh - trombone
Ricky Lawson - drums
Carolyn Leonhart, Cynthia Calhoun and Victoria Cave - vocals

Production
Director: Earle Sebastian
Producer: Joel Hinman
Executive producers: Craig Fruin and John Beug
Executive producers for Believe: Luke Thornton and Liz Silver
Executive producer for In the Spotlight: David Horn
Recording and mixing: Elliot Scheiner and Roger Nichols
Representation: Craig Fruin/HK Management
Package photography: Michael Northrop, Photodisc and Annalisa

References

External links
Former official site

2000 live albums
2000 video albums
Live video albums
Steely Dan live albums